Byrama (Bırama) is a rural locality (a selo), the only inhabited locality, and the administrative center of Kholguminsky Rural Okrug of Megino-Kangalassky District in the Sakha Republic, Russia, located  from Mayya, the administrative center of the district. Its population as of the 2010 Census was 294; down from 347 recorded in the 2002 Census.

References

Notes

Sources
Official website of the Sakha Republic. Registry of the Administrative-Territorial Divisions of the Sakha Republic. Megino-Kangalassky District. 

Rural localities in Megino-Kangalassky District